Wendi Thomas is a Republican member of the Pennsylvania House of Representatives from the  178th Legislative District.

Career
Thomas previously served on the school board for the Council Rock School District.

Pennsylvania House of Representatives 
Thomas ran in a special election to replace outgoing State Representative Scott Petri, who resigned his seat to become the executive director of the Philadelphia Parking Authority, but lost to Democrat Helen Tai by 51% to 49% margin. Thomas ran again in the November general election and defeated Tai by a 500 vote margin.

Tenure 
Thomas authored House Bill 1421, a bill to increase burial benefits to ensure veterans are laid to rest with military honors. The bill was unanimously passed by the house on June 9, 2021. The bill is awaiting further consideration from the senate.

References

External links
PA House website bio
Republican Caucus bio

Republican Party members of the Pennsylvania House of Representatives
People from Bucks County, Pennsylvania
Gettysburg College alumni
21st-century American politicians
Living people
Year of birth missing (living people)